Not to be confused with Greeley, PA sculptor of the same name.

Tom Holmes (born 1979 in Ozona, Texas) is an American artist based in Jackson County, Tennessee.

Education
Holmes received a  Bachelor of Fine Arts from the University of Texas at Austin in 1999, the student of Peter Saul and Linda Montano. They received a Master of Fine Arts from the University of California Los Angeles in 2002 where they studied with John Baldessari, Mary Kelly, Paul McCarthy, Lari Pittman, Pipilotti Rist and Wolfgang Tillmans.

The artist worked briefly for Richard Tuttle in 2005.

Exhibitions
Holmes mounted their first solo museum show Temporary Monument  in 2013 at the Kunsthalle Bern. Their work has been included in exhibitions at Palais de Tokyo, Paris; Contemporary Art Biennial, Sélestat, France;  Malmö Konstmuseum, Sweden and the Whitney Museum at Altria, New York. Work resides in the public collections of Albright-Knox, FRAC Bourgogne, Stiftung Kunsthalle Bern, and The Frances Young Tang Museum and Art Gallery at Skidmore College.

Artwork

Working within the "problems of abstraction" the artist often takes up a class-conscious cultural criticism through the genre of the funerary as well as processes derived from psychic automatism. Utilizing abstract compositional constructions and modest sculptural materials, such as concrete blocks, folding chairs, and cereal boxes, the works bear witness to the condition of the inevitable.  Anne Doran writes, Holmes's work is "redolent of institutional limbos and marginal lives, with shrill bottom notes of failure and fear."

Honors
 100 W Corsicana
 Joan Mitchell Center
 Pollock-Krasner Foundation
 Edward F. Albee Foundation 
 HomeSession
 The Helene Wurlitzer Foundation
 Reed Foundation

Publications/Press
 Mark Jenkins, 'In the Galleries: Tom Holmes', The Washington Post
 Trey Burns, 'Tom Holmes', 100 W Corsicana
 Andrew Russeth, ‘Tom Holmes: Piss Yellow / Bars and Stars at Bureau, GalleristNY.com
 Boško Blagojevic, ‘Critic’s Pick: Piss Yellow / Bars and Stars’, Artforum.com
 "First Proof - Portfolio: Tom Holmes", Bomb, Fall 2013, pp. 65, 68-9.
 Whitney Museum of American Art at Altria: 25 Years. New York: Whitney Museum of American Art, 2008. Print.
 Rist, Pipilotti, Richard Julin, and Tessa Praun. Pipilotti Rist: Congratulations!Baden: Lars Müller, 2007. Print.
 Dorfsman, Alex, and Yoshua Okon. La Panadería, 1994-2002. México, D.F.: Editorial Turner De México, 2005. Print.

References

External links
 Tom Holmes is represented in NYC by BUREAU
 https://www.vonammon.co/tom-holmes
https://asiancurator.com/tom-holmes/
https://www.albrightknox.org/person/tom-holmes
 https://kunsthalle-bern.ch/ausstellungen/2013/tom-holmes/?search_highlighter=Tom+Holmes
 http://www.catherinebastide.com/sites/default/files/other-artists/files/Dossier%20Complet%20ANGL.pdf
 Dispatch http://www.dispatchbureau.com/projects/2010.holmes.html
 http://www.galerie-fuer-gegenwartskunst.de/ausstellungen/
https://www.bu.edu/cfa/tuesday-night-lecture-series-tom-holmes/

1979 births
UCLA School of the Arts and Architecture alumni
American contemporary painters
American abstract artists
21st-century American painters
21st-century American sculptors
People from Crockett County, Texas
University of Texas at Austin College of Fine Arts alumni
Painters from New York City
Sculptors from Tennessee
Sculptors from Texas
Living people
People from Putnam County, Tennessee
Sculptors from New York (state)